Deo Narayan Yadav (died 4 March, 2003) was an Indian politician and freedom fighter, elected first time 1952–1957 and 1957–1962 from Ladaniya constituency (now Babubarhi constituency). He was a member of the first ministry of Bihar led by Krishana Sinha. Yadav served as the 12th Speaker of the Bihar Legislative Assembly from 1995–2000. He represented the Babubarhi Constituency in Madhubani from 1977–1980 and 1990-till death. Yadav died at his official residence on Tuesday, 82 years old and sitting Rashtriya Janata Dal MLA from Babubarhi assembly seat in Madhubani. Bihar Governor V C Pande, assembly Speaker Sadanand Singh, Bihar Legislative Council chairman Prof. Jabir Hussain, Chief Minister Rabri Devi and RJD supremo's Lalu Prasad Yadav expressed grief and shock at the sudden demise of Yadav.

References

2003 deaths
People from Madhubani district
Rashtriya Janata Dal politicians
Speakers of the Bihar Legislative Assembly
Janata Dal politicians
Janata Party politicians
Bihar MLAs 1990–1995
Bihar MLAs 1995–2000
Bihar MLAs 2000–2005
Bihar MLAs 1977–1980
Bihar MLAs 1952–1957
Bihar MLAs 1957–1962
State cabinet ministers of Bihar
Indian independence activists
Indian National Congress politicians from Bihar
Year of birth uncertain